The University of Peradeniya is a public university in Sri Lanka, funded by the University Grants Commission. It is the largest university in Sri Lanka, which was originally established as the University of Ceylon in 1942. The university was officially opened on 20 April 1954, in the presence of Queen Elizabeth II, by Prince Philip, Duke of Edinburgh.

The University of Peradeniya hosts nine faculties (including the newly added Management faculty), three postgraduate institutes, 10 centres, 73 departments, and teaches about 12,000 students in the fields of Medicine, Agriculture, Arts, Science, Engineering, Dental Sciences, Veterinary Medicine and Animal Science, Management and Allied Health Science. It claims to have the largest government endowment by a higher education institution in Sri Lanka, based on its large staff and faculties/departments.

Location

The University of Peradeniya site touches the natural environment of the lower slopes of the Hanthana mountain range. The Botanical Garden of Peradeniya is close by.

Most of the area remains afforested.

The main entrance to the university is through Galaha road. The Faculty of Engineering is on one side of the Mahaweli River and all other faculties are on the other side. The Akbar bridge links the two banks of the river. Considered as a marvel of civil engineering, it was designed by A. Thurairajah (Dean of the Faculty of Engineering, 1975–77 and 1982–85), and built by the first batch of the faculty, in the year of its inception.

The Sarasavi Uyana railway station is on campus. Another bridge known as Yaka Paalama links the railway to the other bank. Daily shuttle bus services operate from Kandy to Galaha junction and Kandy to the university.

A separate sub-campus was established in 1968 at Mahailuppallama, North Central province for the Faculty of Agriculture. Separate residential facilities are provided to this sub-campus.

History

Beginnings

The proposal for the establishment of University of Ceylon, the first university of Sri Lanka (the predecessor of the University of Peradeniya) goes back to 1899. But no progress was seen until the formation of the Ceylon University Association in 1906 under the guidance of Sir Ponnambalam Arunachalam, Sir James Peiris and Sir Marcus Fernando. Its request for a European-style university in Sri Lanka was partially granted by the British rulers with the formation of Ceylon University College on 1 January 1921.

The University Council, through which the administration of the Ceylon University College was done, appointed committees to plan the academic activities of a future university. It made suggestions to build the university in Bullers Road (now Bauddhaloka Mawatha) in Colombo, but it was disputed by politicians. To resolve the conflict, the then Governor Hugh Clifford appointed a committee headed by Justice M. T. Akbar on 20 December 1926. It suggested that the proposed university should be unitary, residential and outside Colombo. Another committee was appointed in 1928 with Sir Walter Buchanan-Riddel as chairman. The committee initially proposed a site at Uyanawatta, in the Dumbara Valley close to Kandy. H. B. Lees, the Director of Public Works however proposed Mavilmada and Austin Woodeson, the Chief Architect recommended Aruppola, both on the Kandy side of the Dumbara Valley as better sites than Uyanawatta. Dr. Samuel Chelliah Paul and Andreas Nell pointed out the disadvantages of those sites and proposed a larger one at Peradeniya.

Although the site was acquired, no plans were made to establish the university until 1941. With the arrival of Sir Ivor Jennings, as the second principal of the Ceylon University College, establishment plans were put into effect. He stressed the urgent need to move the university to Peradeniya to the Minister of Education C. W. W. Kannangara and took the initiative in the process. Thus he is considered the forefather of the University of Peradeniya.

1942 to 1952

In 1942, the University of Ceylon was created as the first unitary, residential and autonomous university in Sri Lanka with its seat in Peradeniya, amalgamating Ceylon University College and the Medical College into a single unit with 55 academic staff members, 904 students in four faculties. But due to World War II, the construction of buildings started in 1946. Until then, the lectures and laboratory classes were conducted in the buildings obtained from the Ceylon University College and the Ceylon Medical College in Colombo.

Consultants Sir Patrick Abercrombie and Clifford Holliday did the planning and layout of the university complex. The first phase of work constituted only the development of the left bank. The building of a bridge across the Mahaweli River, later known as the 'Akbar bridge', was planned by Prof. A Thurairajah. Transfer of the first batch of students, students from the Departments of Law and Agriculture and the third and fourth-year students of the Department of Veterinary Science, from Colombo to Peradeniya took place in 1949. Another major move took place in 1952, with the transfer of staff and students of the Faculties of Arts and Oriental Studies, together with the Main Library and the University Administration. This movement on 6 October 1952 marks the official establishment of the University of Ceylon, Peradeniya. In the initial stages, vice chancellor Jennings wanted to model British universities but met with resistance from students who opposed the changes.

1952 to 1972

Although the buildings at Peradeniya were established in 1952, the official ceremony for its inception was held on 20 April 1954, with the participation of Queen Elizabeth II. The Sri Lankan government was keen to postpone the ceremony until Queen Elizabeth II could participate. Her visit was delayed by the death of King George VI. Prince Philip, Duke of Edinburgh also participated in the event. He declared the university opened:

Sections of the University of Ceylon functioned in Colombo and Peradeniya acted as campuses of the same university until 1967. In 1967, these campuses were split into two. The section in Peradeniya was known as the University of Ceylon, Peradeniya, while the section in Colombo was known as the University of Ceylon, Colombo.

1972 to 1978

By the University Act No. 1 of 1972, four universities functioned a —  Peradeniya, Colombo, Vidyodaya and Vidyalankara and the Ceylon College of Technology, Katubedda, Moratuwa became five constituent campuses of a single structure – the University of Sri Lanka. It had one vice chancellor and five presidents for five campuses. Under this designation, the University of Ceylon – Peradeniya became the University of Sri Lanka – Peradeniya Campus. This designation prevailed until 1978.

1978 to the present 
Under the Universities Act No. 16, 1978, the University of Sri Lanka was split into six independent, autonomous institutions as the University of Peradeniya, University of Colombo, University of Sri Jayewardenepura, University of Kelaniya, University of Moratuwa and University of Jaffna. This Act brought back some of the central features of the Ceylon University Ordinance of 1942 such as the senates, the councils and courts.

Governance and administration
The University of Peradeniya operates under the provisions of the Universities Act No. 16 of 1978 and the Universities (Amendment) Act No. 7 of 1985. It is a state university and the undergraduate study is 100% free. Therefore, it depends on the government for much of its annual grant, which is provided by the University Grants Commission (UGC). Due to this, its administration is heavily influenced by the UGC. The administration is based upon that of the former University of Ceylon consisting of a dual structure of bodies: the council (formally known as the University Court which is the governing body) and the Academic Senate (academic affairs).

Officers 

Chancellor
The chancellor is the head of the university and is responsible for awarding all the academic degrees. Usually, the chancellor is a distinguished person in an academic discipline. Otherwise, it is a member of the clergy or a distinguished person from civil society. The President of Sri Lanka appoints the chancellor. The position is mainly ceremonial and duties are usually carried out by the vice-chancellor. The current chancellor of the university is Prof. Gerald Peiris.
Vice chancellor
The vice chancellor is the de facto principal academic and administrative officer of the university, responsible for management tasks. This appointment is also done by the President of Sri Lanka. The current vice chancellor is Prof.  M.D. Lamawansa, who is also the Professor of Surgery.

The deputy vice-chancellor is Prof. W.M. Terrance Madhujith, Professor of Food Science.
Deans of Faculties
Deans are the heads of the faculties. They are responsible for the management and the tasks carried out by the faculty. Deans are appointed by the chancellor for three years.

List of chancellors and vice chancellors

Chancellors
University of Ceylon and University of Sri Lanka
 Sir Andrew Caldecott [1942–44]
 Sir Henry Monck-Mason Moore (1944–49)
 Lord Soulbury (1949–54)
 Sir Oliver Goonetilleke (1954–62)
 William Gopallawa (1962–78)
University of Peradeniya
 J. R. Jayewardene (1978 – July 1979)
 Victor Tennekoon (1979 – 31 January 1984)
 T. B. Panabokke (1 Feb 1984–1989)
 Fredrick de Silva (1990–1993)
 Prof. Ediriweera Sarachchandra (1993 to 1996)
 Prof. R. G. Panabokke (1999 to 2002)
 Deshamanya R. K. W. Goonesekera (2002 to 2006)
 Dr. Premadasa Udagama (2007 to 2012)
 Prof. P. W. Epasinghe

Vice Chancellors
University of Ceylon
 Prof. Sir Ivor Jennings (1942–55)
 Prof. Sir Nicholas Attygalle (1955–66)
University of Ceylon, Peradeniya
 S. J. Walpita, CCS (1966–68)
 M. J. Perera, CCS (1968–69)
 Prof. E.O.E. Pereira (1969–71)
University of Sri Lanka
 Prof.B. A. Abeywickrema (1972–74)
 L. H. Sumanadasa (1974)
 Prof. P. P. G. L. Siriwardena (1974–78)
 Prof. S. Kodikara (president, Peradeniya Campus)
 Prof. P. W. Vithanage (president, Peradeniya Campus)
University of Peradeniya
 Prof. B. L. Panditharatne (1978–84)
 Prof. M. A. Fernando (1984–85)
 Prof. R. G. Panabokke (1985–88)
 Prof. A. P. R. Aluwihare (1988–89)
 Prof. C. L. V. Jayathilake (1989–91)
 Prof. J. M. Gunadasa (1991–94)
 Prof. C. M. Madduma Bandara (1994–97)
 Prof. R. A. L. H. Gunawardana (1997–00)
 Prof. Kapila Gunasekara (2000–06)
 Prof. Harishchandra Abeygunawardena (2006–09)
 Prof. S. B. S. Abayakoon (2009–12)
 Prof. A. Senaratne (2012–15)

Faculties and institutions

The university has eight academic faculties of study. These faculties contain 72 departments. In addition, the university has two postgraduate institutions and six affiliated centres. At the beginning, it had only three present-day faculties —  the Faculty of Arts, the Faculty of Medicine and the Faculty of Science. Departments of Law and Oriental Studies functioned separately. Since then, five other faculties have been added. The latest addition is the Faculty of Allied Health Science, established in 2005.

The Post-graduate Institute of Science (PGIS) and Post-graduate Institute of Agriculture (PGIA) are the institutions established in the university. PGIS is a national institute established by the Ministry of Higher Education, Sri Lanka in 1996. PGIA was established in 1975 and offers three postgraduate degrees. PGIA offers postgraduate-level courses in Agricultural disciplines. In addition to these institutions, Senerath Paranavitana Teaching and Research Museum functions affiliated with the Department of Archaeology, Faculty of Arts. It was established in 1960.

Ranking
In 2022, Times Higher Education World University Rankings placed the University of Peradeniya first in Sri Lanka and 401–500 band in the world university ranking. This is the highest world ranking that any university in Sri Lanka has reached in recent history. The University of Peradeniya has also been ranked first in Sri Lanka under other popular university rankings schemes such as Times Higher Education world university rankings, QS world university rankings and U.S. News & World Report global university ranking in 2022. In 2019–2020, according to the University Ranking by Academic Performance (URAP), the University of Peradeniya ranked first in Sri Lanka and 1123rd in the world. The University of Peradeniya was ranked No. 1 in Sri Lanka based on total ResearchGate scores.

Library network

The library is a centrally administered network of libraries. It is considered the oldest academic library in Sri Lanka. Containing over 430,000 items, it is one of the largest libraries serving the country. Seven branches are in faculties in the main campus at Peradeniya and one other branch is in the Mahailuppallama sub-campus.

University of Peradeniya library contains a legal deposit collection of 300,000 items, a special collection of 15,000+ items acquired from various individuals, palm-leaf manuscript collection of approximately 5,000 (second largest in Sri Lanka) and a microfilm collection of 17,000. Furthermore, it owns the largest historical map collection in Sri Lanka.

Student life

Student organizations

Students at the University of Peradeniya run over 100 clubs and organizations. These include cultural and religious groups, academic clubs, and common-interest organizations. The Peradeniya Students' Union (PSU) is considered the highest body which represents all internal students. Separate student unions operate in each faculty. These student societies include:

 Agriculture Students Union (AgSU)
Agriculture Faculty English Literary Association (AFELA)
 Agriculture Management Science Society (AGMAG)
Agriculture Faculty Forestry Society
 Agriculture Faculty Journalism and Media Society (AFJM)
 Arts Circle – Faculty of Agriculture
 International Students' Forum (ISF), University of Peradeniya
 Inventors Club – Faculty of Agriculture
 Nature Society
 Horticulture Society
 Society of Food Science and Technology
 Biology Guild
 Arts Students Union (ASU)
 Science Students Union (SSU)
 Engineering Students Union (ESU)
 Dental Faculty Students Union (DFSU)
 Medical Faculty Students' Union (MFSU)
 Societies in the Faculty of Engineering
 Engineering Students' Publication Society (ESPS)
 Association of Computer Engineering Students (ACES)
 Civil Engineers Society (CES)
 Chemical Engineering Students Society (ChESS)
 Electrical and Electronic Engineers Society (EEES)
 Engineering Faculty Art Circle
 Engineering Faculty Buddhist Brotherhood
 Mechanical Engineers Society (MES)
 Production Engineering Students Society (PESS)
 Power and Highvoltage Engineers Society (PHES)
 Societies in the Faculty of Science
 Art Circle
 Buddhist Brotherhood Faculty of Science
 Botanical Society
 Chemical Society
 Computer Society University of Peradeniya (CSUP)
 Hantana Conservation Society
 Hindu Society
 Mathematics Society
 Photographic Society
 Physical Society
 Science Library Club
 Tamil Sangeetha Natya Sangam
 Tamil Society
 University Explorers Club
 University Geological Society
 Zoologists' Association

 Cultural Societies
 Ceylon University Dramatic Society (DramSoc)
 English Literary Association (ELA)
 Film Society (FilmSoc)
 Gandarwa Sabhawa
 Sinhala Natya Mandalaya
 Sinhala Sangamaya
 Tamil Sangeetha Natya Sangam
 Tamil Society
 Religious Societies
 Buddhist Brotherhood
 Hindu Students' Union
 Newman Society (for Roman Catholics)
 Student Christian Movement
 University Buddhist Society
 University Muslim Majlis
 Other Societies
 AIESEC in University of Peradeniya
 Arunachalum-Hall Alumni Association
 MIDI Group
 http://perabeats.lk/ media society
 Rotaract Club
 Sports Council
 Student Meditation Society
 University Explorers' Club
 University Gavel Club

Sports

Sports activities are conducted by the Department of Physical Education. The University of Peradeniya has 30 athletics teams to date. Facilities include a well-equipped gymnasium, one of the largest multi-purpose outstation stadiums in Sri Lanka, a 50m swimming pool and separate stadiums for cricket, rugby, football, hockey, tennis, track and field, and elle.

Residential facilities

The University of Peradeniya is the only residential university in Sri Lanka. It provides residential facilities to most of its undergraduate students, all its academic staff members and guests. Three guest houses — Gal Bangalawa, Upper Hantana Guest House and Lady Hill a tourist hotel – come under university administration. Residential halls for undergraduate students:

International collaborations
The university has developed international relationships since its earliest days. Student exchange programs (Erasmus and International Credit Mobility Programme with SLU, Sweden), collaborative research, split postgraduate programs, international seminars, conferences and short courses are being carried out with these global partners by the Directorate of Research and International Affairs. This was established as a separate institution in 2006. UoP has initiated cooperation programs with foreign governments and institutions.

Academic networking
UoP is a member of the Association of Commonwealth Universities (ACU) academic network.

Research and academic partners
The university has signed Memorandums of Understanding for research and academic development with these international universities.

  University of California, Davis Campus, United States
  National University of Singapore, Singapore
  University of Pennsylvania, United States (with Solomon ASCH Centre for the Study of Ethnopolitical Conflict)
  University of Ottawa, Canada (Governance and Institutional Strengthening Project)
  Carnegie Mellon University, United States
  University of Aberdeen, United Kingdom (with School of Biological Sciences)
  University of Göttingen, Germany (with Institut für Sportwissenschaften)
  University of Guelph, Canada (cooperation in Food and Science Technology)
  University of Naples Federico II, Italy
  University of North Dakota, United States
  Marche Polytechnic University, Italy
  North South University, Bangladesh (Public Policy and Governance)
  Institute of Polytechnic de Grenoble, France (Educational and Scientific cooperation)
  Yamagata University, Japan
  Institute National Polytechnique de Lorraine, France (Higher Education on Disaster Mitigation)
  Hokkaido University, Japan (With Graduate School of Veterinary Medicine)
  University for Foreigners Perugia, Italy
  Osaka Prefecture University, Japan (cooperation in Veterinary Medicine and Animal Science)
  Rajamangala University of Technology, Thailand
  Saga University, Japan (Telemedicine)
  Dongguk University, South Korea (Pali and Buddhist Studies)
  Niigata University, Japan
  University of Limerick, Ireland
  Lincoln University, New Zealand
  United Nations University, Japan
  Yonsei University, South Korea (academic exchange and cooperation)
  Asian Institute of Technology (AIT), Thailand (Asian Regional Research Programme on Environmental Technology Phase II)
  Universiti Sains, Malaysia
  Lund University, Sweden
  National Formosa University, Taiwan

Intercollegiate Sri Lanka Education program
The Intercollegiate Sri Lanka Education (ISLE) program provides facilities for undergraduate students from United States of America to study in Sri Lanka. Each year, about 20 undergraduates spend five months in Sri Lanka following courses given by members of the Faculty of Arts. This programme also involves an exchange of faculty.
  Cornell University, Ithaca, NY, United States
  Bates College, Maine, United States
  Bowdoin College, Maine, United States
  Carleton College, Minnesota, United States
  Colby University, Maine, United States
  Grinnell College, Iowa, United States
  College of the Holy Cross, Worcester, United States
  Macalester College, Minnesota, United States
  Swarthmore College, Pennsylvania, United States
  Whittier College, California, United States

Government partnerships
  Government of Sweden – research cooperation on SAREC project
  Government of Japan – capacity building training programme for Oral & Maxillafacial surgeons
  Government of Egypt – Arabic student exchange program and teaching Islamic civilization
  Swedish International Development Cooperation Agency (SIDA)
  United Nations Development Programme (UNDP) – research cooperation

People

Students 

The total number of undergraduates in the university for the year 2009–2010 was 9,605. Student intake for that year remained at 2,620. In 2008, 1514 postgraduate students studied at the university, most of them affiliated with the two postgraduate institutions: Postgraduate Institute of Science (PGIS) and Postgraduate Institute of Agriculture (PGIA). Postgraduate output for the year was 358, including 15 doctorates. Faculties except Science and Agriculture conducted their own postgraduate courses.

Women constituted 53.15 percent of undergraduates. Women constituted remained over 45 percent in all faculties except Faculty of Engineering where it was 15.46 percent. Courses in all faculties except Faculty of Arts are taught in English medium. In the Faculty of Arts, 69.85 percent of undergraduates are enrolled in Sinhala, 15.93 percent in Tamil and 14.22 percent in English.

Alumni

The University of Peradeniya has produced a large number of alumni. Among the best-known are Sri Lankans are Hon. W. J. M. Lokubandara; former speaker of the parliament (2005–2010), Sri Lankabhimanya Hon. Lakshman Kadirgamar; distinguished diplomat, politician and lawyer, Dr. Jayantha Dhanapala; former Under-Secretary-General for Disarmament Affairs, United Nations, Prof. Gananath Obeyesekere; emeritus Professor of Anthropology at Princeton University and the person who entered into an intellectual debate with Marshall Sahlins over the rationality of indigenous people through the details of Captain James Cook's death in the Hawaiian Islands in 1779, Prof. Anuradha Seneviratna; a renowned Sri Lankan scholar, Prof. Malik Peiris; discoverer of severe acute respiratory syndrome (SARS) virus, Prof. Saman Warnakulasuriya ; OBE- Emeritus Professor King's College London, UK & Director WHO Collaborating Centre on Oral Cancer, Major General Janaka Perera; chief of staff of the Sri Lanka Army and one of the most distinguished generals in Sri Lankan history, Prof. J B Disanayake; head of the Department of Sinhala, University of Colombo., Prof. Kusuma Karunaratne; the first female Professor of Sinhala language Dr. Gunadasa Amarasekera; a prominent Sinhala writer, poet, and essayist and Prof. Neelan Tiruchelvam – A Sri Lankan Tamil politician, peace activist and an internationally respected academic. Founder and director of the International Centre for Ethnic Studies and the founder and director of The Law and Society Trust.

Faculty

The number of permanent academic staff at the University of Peradeniya is 731. It is the university in Sri Lanka that is served by the highest number of professors, associate professors and academic staff. Teacher to student ratio of the university was 1:13 by 2008.

The University of Peradeniya has been served by a number of world-class faculty. Distinguished faculty include Prof. Stanley Jeyaraja Tambiah; professor in anthropology (1955–1960), a leading social anthropologist in the world, recipient of the prestigious Balzan Prize, the highest recognition of the Royal Anthropological Institute of Great Britain and Ireland and Esther and Sidney Rabb Professor (Emeritus) of Anthropology at Harvard University, Prof. Senarath Paranavithana; the pioneering archeologist and epigraphist of Sri Lanka and once the archaeological commissioner, Prof. Gunapala Malalasekera; famous Sri Lankan scholar and diplomat; compiler of the "Gunapala Sinhala-English Dictionary", Prof. Anuradha Seneviratna; a renowned Sri Lankan scholar, Prof. Seneka Bibile, the founder of Sri Lanka's drug policy and the greatest medical benefactor of humanity that Sri Lanka has hitherto produced. and Prof. Ashley Halpé, a prominent Sri Lankan writer.

Criticism

Ragging
The university has been criticized for its high level of ragging with several incidents grabbing national headlines. These include the death of S. Varapragash in 1997 due to kidney failure following severe ragging by a group of senior students and the permanent disability of Rupa Rathnaseeli in 1975 as a result of having jumped from the second floor of the hostel Ramanathan Hall to escape the physical ragging by the seniors. She died by suicide in 2002. In 1997, Selvanayagam Varapragash, a first-year engineering student was murdered on the campus due to hazing. He was subjected to sadistic ragging, and in the post-mortem, a large quantity of toothpaste was found in his rectum.

Popular culture

The University of Peradeniya holds a central position in classical university education, which has made it the setting for many dramas, films, songs, poems, novels and other cultural works in Sri Lanka.

Songs like "Hanthanata paayana sanda..." by Amarasiri Peiris, "Hanthane kandu muduna sisara..." by W. D. Amaradeva, "Hanthana adaviye meduru kulunu sudu sandaluthalaa pisa..." by Nanda Malini, "Mé nagaraya maa oba munagasunu nagarayayi..." by Mervin Perera, "Hanthane raja dahane...", "Nethu saluna...", "Hantana Desin ena..." are only a few of them. Movies like Gamini Fonseka's Saagarayak Meda (In the middle of an ocean) and Sugathapala Senarath Yapa's Hanthane Kathawa (The story of Hanthana) are directly based on University of Peradeniya.

UoP is featured in novels: Siri Gunasinghe's Sevanella (The shadow) and Gunadasa Amarasekara's Ek Sathya Kathawak (One true story). Groundbreaking dramas like Prof. Ediriweera Sarachchandra's Maname (1957) and Sinhabahu (1960) were first directed and played there. In Sarachchandra's novel Heta Echchara Kaluvara Nae (Tomorrow is not that dark), an entire chapter is dedicated to describing the beauty of the university.

Further reading
 De Silva, K. M. and Jayatilaka, Tissa (eds). Peradeniya: Memories of a University, International Centre for Ethnic Studies, Kandy (1997), 
 Peiris, Ralph. Universities, politics and public opinion in Ceylon, Springer, Netherlands (Volume 2, Number 4 / June 1964).  (Print)  (Online). 435-454pp.
 Goonetileke H. A. I. Introduction to Jennings’s The Kandy Road (1993)
 Jennings, Sir Ivor The Road to Peradeniya (Autobiography),  
 Gooneratne, Yasmine. The Sweet and Simple Kind: A Poetic Account of a Nation's Troubled Awakening, Abacus Publishers (2006),  /   (UK edition)

See also

Education in Sri Lanka
Sri Lankan universities
University of Ceylon
 List of split up universities

Notes

a.  Table 2.1.1: Total student enrolment by faculty (pp.24), University Hand Book 2009 published by the University of Peradeniya publications (2010).
b.  Table 2.1.1: Total student enrolment by faculty (pp.24), University Hand Book 2009.
c.  Table 2.1.1: Postgraduate students by faculty (pp.24), University Hand Book 2009.
d.  "The oldest academic library in Sri Lanka, founded in 1921 as the university College Library became the University of Ceylon Library in 1942 and was moved to Peradeniya in 1952. Currently, it has one of the largest collections in the country, numbering more than 500,000 in volume" – International dictionary of library histories, Volume 1.
e.  Table 2.1.15: Undergraduate enrolment by ethnicity (pp.39), University Hand Book 2008
f.  Total number of students in Faculty of Engineering, 2008: 1468. Number female: 227. Table 2.1.4: Undergraduate enrolment by ethnicity (pp.22), University Hand Book 2008
g.  Only permanent staff included. The number of academic staff engaged in university education is retrieved from the University Statistics – 2008 by University Grants Commission of Sri Lanka

References

External links 

 
University of Peradeniya :Proud beginnings
University Grants Commission of Sri Lanka

 
1942 establishments in Ceylon
Educational institutions established in 1942
Engineering universities and colleges in Sri Lanka
Forestry education
Statutory boards of Sri Lanka
Education in Kandy District
Universities and colleges in Central Province, Sri Lanka
Universities in Sri Lanka